Nelson Nieves (25 December 1934 – 13 January 2021) was a Venezuelan fencer. He competed in the team foil events at the 1952 Summer Olympics.

References

External links
 

1934 births
2021 deaths
Venezuelan male foil fencers
Olympic fencers of Venezuela
Fencers at the 1952 Summer Olympics
Pan American Games medalists in fencing
Pan American Games bronze medalists for Venezuela
Fencers at the 1955 Pan American Games
Fencers at the 1963 Pan American Games